Glyphostoma epicasta is a species of sea snail, a marine gastropod mollusk in the family Clathurellidae.

Description
The size of an adult shell varies between 14 mm and 31 mm.

Distribution
G. epicasta can be found in the Caribbean Sea, along Colombia and Puerto Rico, in the Gulf of Mexico along Louisiana and in the Atlantic Ocean along Brazil.

References

External links
 
 Rosenberg G., Moretzsohn F. & García E. F. (2009). Gastropoda (Mollusca) of the Gulf of Mexico, pp. 579–699 in Felder, D.L. and D.K. Camp (eds.), Gulf of Mexico–Origins, Waters, and Biota. Biodiversity. Texas A&M Press, College Station, Texas

epicasta
Gastropods described in 1934